Paul "The Plumber" Davidson (born 1955) is a British businessman who made, and then lost, a fortune when he floated his business on the London Stock Exchange and has since floated a new firm, Fluid Leader Group plc, on the London Plus market in 2008.

A former pipe-fitter, from which his nickname derives, Davidson was fined £750,000 by the Financial Services Authority for market abuse in 2004, a fine which was subsequently overturned.

References

Living people
1955 births
20th-century British businesspeople
21st-century British businesspeople